The following is a list of lists of known supercentenarians (people who lived to be or are currently living at 110 years or more of age).

Lists organised by geography
List of supercentenarians by continent
List of Italian supercentenarians
List of German supercentenarians
List of French supercentenarians
List of Belgian supercentenarians
List of Dutch supercentenarians
List of Irish supercentenarians
List of British supercentenarians
List of American supercentenarians
List of Canadian supercentenarians
List of Japanese supercentenarians
List of Spanish supercentenarians
List of Portuguese supercentenarians
List of supercentenarians in the Nordic countries
List of Danish supercentenarians
List of Swedish supercentenarians
List of Norwegian supercentenarians
List of Finnish supercentenarians

Other lists
 Lists of centenarians